Roflumilast, sold under the trade name Daxas among others, is a drug that acts as a selective, long-acting inhibitor of the enzyme phosphodiesterase-4 (PDE-4). It has anti-inflammatory effects and is used as an orally administered drug for the treatment of inflammatory conditions of the lungs such as chronic obstructive pulmonary disease (COPD).

In June 2010, it was approved in the European Union for severe COPD associated with chronic bronchitis. In February 2011, it gained FDA approval in the United States for reducing COPD exacerbations. It is available as a generic medication.

Medical uses
Roflumilast is indicated for the treatment of severe chronic obstructive pulmonary disease (COPD) and for the treatment of plaque psoriasis.

It is used in the prevention of exacerbations (lung attacks) in severe chronic obstructive pulmonary disease (COPD).

Adverse effects

Common (1–10% incidence) adverse effects include:
 Diarrhea
 Weight loss
 Nausea
 Headache
 Insomnia
 Decreased appetite
 Abdominal pain
 Rhinitis
 Sinusitis
 Urinary tract infection
 Depression

References

External links 
 

Benzamides
Chloropyridines
Organofluorides
PDE4 inhibitors
Phenol ethers
Cyclopropyl compounds
AbbVie brands
AstraZeneca brands
Takeda Pharmaceutical Company brands